The Light Strike Vehicle (LSV) is an improved version of the Desert Patrol Vehicle (DPV) it replaced.  Although the conventional US military replaced its DPVs with Humvees, special operation groups adopted the LSV for its small size and high mobility. It is part of the family of Internally Transportable Light Strike Vehicles (ITV-LSV). It is used for fast hit-and-run style raids (as its name suggests), scouting missions, special forces support, and low intensity guerrilla warfare.

Design

Countermeasures
The LSV is entirely unarmored, and thus offers no protection from small arms fire. The driver and passengers sit side by side in front, with the gunner sitting in an elevated rear-central seat in front of the engine. The gunner's seat can spin around to operate the 7.62 mm GPMG.

Mobility
It can be air transported internally by CH-47 or CH-53 transport helicopters. The new ALSV has a more conventional appearance and differs from the original versions.

Armament
A 7.62 mm MG (often an M60E3) is mounted rear-facing on the back of the engines. If TOW is mounted, it replaces the third passenger and rollover cage. Two AT4 are sometimes fitted forward-facing on roll over cage bars (one on each side) above driver.

Users

Unlike the DPV, the LSV has had export success and is marketed as a light attack vehicle. The current generation model is the ALSV, with the "A" standing for "advanced". It is currently used by the United States Marine Corps, United States Army, United States Navy, and the armed forces of Greece, Mexico, Oman, Portugal, and Spain. The UK retired its LSVs in the mid-1990s.

Current operators

Former operators

See also
 Chenowth Advanced Light Strike Vehicle
 P6 ATAV
 VLEGA Gaucho
 Chivunk
 Fabrique Nationale AS 24
 List of land vehicles of the U.S. armed forces
 List of U.S. military vehicles by model number, (M1040 and M1041)
 Willys FAMAE Corvo
 FMC XR311
 Saker LSV

References

 Jane's Special Forces Recognition Guide.
 Light Strike Vehicle at GlobalSecurity.org

Soft-skinned vehicles
Military vehicles of the United States